Nenonen is a Finnish surname. Notable people with the surname include:

Markus Nenonen (born 1992), Finnish ice hockey player
Ulla Nenonen (1933–2018), Finnish theologian and missionary
Vilho Petter Nenonen (1883–1960), Finnish general

Finnish-language surnames